The Billboard Hot Latin Songs is a record chart in the United States for Latin singles, published weekly by Billboard magazine since September 6, 1986. The chart's methodology was only based on airplay from Spanish-language radio stations from its inception until the issue dated October 13, 2012, when Billboard updated its methodology to a multi-metric system, including sales of digital downloads and streaming activity in addition to airplay, as compiled by Nielsen SoundScan.

As of November 2021, the chart has had 446 different number-one hits, while 178 artists have reached number one as a lead or a featured act. Spanish singer Enrique Iglesias has the most number-one hit singles, with 27, as well as the most cumulative weeks at number one, with 189. Puerto Rican rapper Bad Bunny is the artist with the most top 10 songs, with 45, and the most chart entries, with 118. "Despacito" by Puerto Rican acts Luis Fonsi and Daddy Yankee featuring Canadian singer Justin Bieber is the longest-reigning song at number one, with 56 non-consecutive weeks, while "Propuesta Indecente" by Dominican singer Romeo Santos has the longest run on the chart, with 125 total weeks. Previous longest-running number-ones include "Bailando" by Enrique Iglesias featuring Descemer Bueno and Gente de Zona, "La Tortura" by Shakira featuring Alejandro Sanz, "A Puro Dolor" by Son by Four, and "Qué Te Pasa" by Yuri.

As of October 2016, Enrique Iglesias is the chart's best-performing artist of all-time, followed by Mexican singers Luis Miguel and Cristian Castro, Puerto Rican singer Chayanne and Mexican musician Marco Antonio Solís. As of September 2018, "Despacito" by Luis Fonsi and Daddy Yankee featuring Justin Bieber is the chart's best-performing song of all-time, followed by "Propuesta Indecente" by Romeo Santos, "A Puro Dolor" by Puerto Rican group Son by Four, "Mi Gente" by Colombian act J Balvin and French singer Willy William featuring American singer Beyoncé, and "Si Tú Supieras" by Mexican singer Alejandro Fernández.

Song milestones

Most weeks at number one

Most total weeks 

As of December 7, 2013, Billboards recurrent rule removes any song from the chart if it has fallen below number 25 after spending 20 weeks, below number 10 after 26 weeks, or below number five after 52 weeks. The first measure is applied from October 20, 2012 onwards. Previously, descending songs were removed if ranking below number 20 after 20 weeks.

Artist achievements

Most number-one singles

Most cumulative weeks at number one

Most number-one debuts

Most top 10 singles

Most chart entries

Additional achievements
Enrique Iglesias is the artist with the most songs that have topped the chart for at least 10 weeks each, with seven, followed by Daddy Yankee, with five. Iglesias' songs have also spent a collective 620 weeks in the top 10. 
Ricky Martin is the only act to appear on the chart in five different decades –from the 1980s to the 2020s– including his work in Puerto Rican boy band Menudo from 1984 to 1989, which is counted separately. He charted in four decades as a solo artist, like Luis Miguel, Chayanne and Enrique Iglesias.
Bad Bunny holds the record for the most simultaneous top 10, top 20 and top 25 songs –with nine, 18 and 23 tracks, respectively– as well as the most concurrent charting songs in one week, with 24, achieved on the issued dated May 21, 2022, following the release of his album Un Verano Sin Ti. He held the record for the most simultaneous top 10, top 20 and top 25 songs –with eight, 18 and 20 tracks, respectively– achieved on the issued dated March 14, 2020, following the release of his album YHLQMDLG.
J Balvin's "Ginza" garnered him the Guinness World Record for the longest reigning number one by a single artist, with 22 weeks from October 17, 2015 to March 12, 2016.

Most weeks at number one by year

Notes

References

Billboard charts
Latin music
Billboard Hot Latin Songs